John Dodington or Doddington may refer to:

John Dodington (bass), Canadian singer
John Dodington (died 1585), MP for Westminster
John Doddington (fl. 1640), MP